{{Infobox writer
| name = Baqar Naqvi
| image = Baqar_Naqvi_Pic.jpg
| imagesize = 250 px
| caption = Baqar Naqvi
| pseudonym = 
| birth_name = Syed Mohammad Baqar Naqvi (Late)
| birth_date = 
| death_date = 
| occupation = Urdu poet  prose writer and translator   Retired CEO
| nationality = 
| ethnicity = 
| education = CII London, Chartered Insurer
| citizenship = 
| genre = Ghazal/Nazm/Prose/Translation
| subject = 
| movement = 
| notableworks = Nobel Adabiyaat EFU SagaMasnooei Zehaanat Barqiyaat Daaman Ganga, Jamna, Saaraswati Khulyay ki DunyaAlfred NobelMoti Moti RangMutthi Bhar TaarayTaaza Hava| spouse = Feroza Naqvi
| partner = 
| children = 
}}

Baqar Naqvi (4 February 1936 – 13 February 2019) was a Pakistani poet, prose writer and translator in Urdu. His work includes Urdu Poetry (genres - Ghazal and Nazm) Urdu Prose – Short stories, scientific publications, and translations in Urdu language.

His work on matters related to Alfred Nobel is first in the Urdu language.

A chartered insurer by profession, qualified ISO 9000 Lead Auditor, Baqar served as an assistant director of operations in CCL Assurance Ltd, London; executive director of EFU Life Assurance, and, twice as chief executive of ALLIANZ-EFU Health Insurance.

He died on 13 February 2019, aged 83.

Published titles
 Hundred Years of Nobel Peace—Prose - (2012) Nobel Adabiyaat (Nobel Literature of 20th Century) Prose EFU Saga – (History) Urdu Translation - (2007) Msnooei Zehaanat (Artificial Intelligence) a brief review Barqiyaat - (Electronics) with Brief History of Inventions Daaman - Complete Poetic work (2005) Ganga, Jamna, Saaraswati - Selected Poems in Hindi Khaliyay ki Duniya (Genetics) - Prose (2001) Alfred Nobel - Life and Work - Prose (1999) Moti Moti Rang (Colored Pearls) - Poetry  (1994) Mutthi Bhar Taaray (A Handful of Stars) - Poetry (1989) Taaza Hava (Fresh Air) - (1986)Recognition
 UBL-JANG Literary Excellence Award 2010 for the category Best Urdu Prose for the book Nobel Adbiyaat''
 Taaza Hava - 'Best Book in the West' Award by Urdu Markaz International, Los Angeles
 Several Urdu Magazines have published Special Articles and insertions on Baqar Naqvi's work and contribution to Urdu Language.

References

Urdu-language poets from Pakistan
1936 births
Urdu-language translators
Hindi-language writers
2019 deaths